The medical–industrial complex is a network of interactions between pharmaceutical corporations, health care personnel, and medical conglomerates to supply health care-related products and services for a profit. The term is a product of the military–industrial complex and builds from the basis of that concept.

The medical–industrial complex is often discussed in the context of conflict of interest in the health care industry. Discussions regarding the medical-industrial complex often recognize the United States healthcare system. Pharmaceutical companies and healthcare companies can promote bias in physicians by operating for-profit, chain hospitals. Physicians are also bound by corporate regulations on treatment and potential personal investment in medical device companies. Large medical journals responsible for creating medical education material can publish biased or bias-inducing findings, although work has been done to ensure that publishings remain neutral throughout literature. Continuing medical education funded by pharmaceutical companies can induce preference in physicians. Patients can fall victims of this complex through cosmetic surgery promotion, drug inflation, and physician bias. The Food and Drug Administration has created laws that protect patients against the medical-industrial complex in America. In Brazil, the Program for Investment in the Health Industrial Complex created an initiative to expand Brazil's internal infrastructure around healthcare and medical research.

Term
The concept of a "medical–industrial complex" was first advanced by Barbara and John Ehrenreich in the November 1969 issue of the Bulletin of the Health Policy Advisory Center in an article entitled "The Medical Industrial Complex" and in a subsequent book (with Health-PAC), The American Health Empire: Power, Profits, and Politics (Random House, 1970). In the 1970s profit-seeking companies became significant stakeholders in the United States healthcare system. It was further popularized in 1980 by Arnold S. Relman while he served as editor of The New England Journal of Medicine. In a paper titled "The New Medical-Industrial Complex" Relman commented, "The past decade has seen the rise of another kind of private "industrial complex" with an equally great potential for influence on public policy — this time in health care..."

Within the United States

Healthcare corporations 
Healthcare corporations are connected with the creation of chain hospitals. A chain hospital is a subsidiary of a hospital network that works under a for-profit goal of expanding healthcare and establishing hospitals across a country, most notably the United States. These corporations set standards regarding care administration, regulation, and enforcement without fully acknowledging medical ethics and their manifestations. Chain hospitals combined with conglomerate pharmaceutical companies lead to an increase in the price a patient will pay for a single hospital visit. This increase can be felt throughout their visit and lifelong medications can also have lasting influence.

Influence of pharmaceutical companies 

Pharmaceutical companies are a leading influence in the expansion of the Medical-Industrial Complex. Generic pharmaceutical drugs, which have the same chemical properties as branded, profitable drugs, are often sold for a fraction of the cost of their counterparts. For example, a 10 mg dose of asthma medication Singulair can cost up to $250 per month, whereas its generic counterpart Montelukast can cost up to $20 per month. These inflated prices contribute to a worsening health climate where certain patients can barely afford their monthly medications. This creates long-term cycles of poverty and lack of resources for patients and those who depend upon them.

Pharmaceutical companies also produce bias in physicians and other health care professionals. Research performed with pharmaceutical-company funding is more likely to produce favorable results that can extend to physicians who become more likely to promote their product. This suggests that pharmaceutical companies can produce bias in physicians and the studies that support physician's choices. These effects manifest in physicians, who are more likely to prescribe an expensive medicine over a generic alternative if they are familiar with the drug brand.

Laboratory tests are also within reach of pharmaceutical company influence. Physicians are more likely to order unnecessary tests when they are connected with familiar pharmaceutical companies. Many companies also set these tests at an inflated price in an effort to increase profit.

Influence of chain hospitals 
Chain hospitals, in collaboration with pharmaceutical companies, lead to the escalation of health costs. Chain hospitals and other healthcare conglomerates hold a monopoly over health care costs within their hospitals and respective subsidiaries. Thus, they can inflate healthcare costs with the goal to increase profit, or lower hospital standards to cut corners where necessary. The management of health care organizations by business staff rather than local medical practice is one of the trends of the increasing influence of the medical-industrial complex. Hospitals in one state can be monitored by systems elsewhere, which give significantly less power to local healthcare professionals. Physicians who know their local government and people can feel less obligated to support the members of their community. Likewise, it decreases the personal relationships physicians can form with patients. Standards set by chain hospitals also set compliance rules, disclosures, and regulations that are oftentimes unattainable by healthcare professionals. Overall, chain hospitals are structured with a goal of profit in mind that often disregard the physicians and healthcare professionals that play a front-line role in treatment, prevention, and detection. Chain hospitals are often associated with for-profit hospitals.

Bias in education 
Medical students and residents, as part of their curriculum, are often expected to read from large medical journal organizations, like the New England Journal of Medicine. These large journals can unknowingly produce bias in their publishings. A peer-reviewed journal can even be subject to bias, because many large studies are often funded by healthcare corporations or pharmaceutical companies. These publishings can inherently promote one expensive treatment over another, less-expensive treatment, even if they may yield the same results. Likewise, the cost of treatment in large medical journals is rarely mentioned. New treatments are often labelled as "low-cost," as opposed to clearly giving the average cost of an exam or drug to a patient. Avoiding specific information about how healthcare can affect a patient's quality of life, either through healthcare cost or potential side-effects, supports the separation between physician and patient. Physicians must be cognizant about a patient's financial standing, and how likely they can pay back expensive medical care. Prescribing expensive medications can also in-debt a patient for the rest of their life, and physicians should take medication cost into account when treating a patient.

Continuing medical education 

The medical-industrial complex funds continuing medical education that often has a bias to promote the interest of its funders. To continue practicing as a board-certified physician, which most hospitals require, a physician must take a continuing medical education course. Continuing medical education is a program that ensures physicians are up-to-date with recent medicine and programs, also giving them board certification if they pass the exam at the end of the course. These courses are often sponsored by pharmaceutical companies and healthcare corporations, who can instill bias in physicians. For example, if a course was sponsored by a medical device company, then the coursework and exam would reference utilizing that medical device. When the course is completed, it is more likely that physicians will use that medical device when interacting with patients, which can present a clear conflict of interest. The medical device may be unnecessary in the patients treatment, undergoing efficacy research, or not the ideal device to use when treating a patient, which can all contribute to the unfair treatment of the patient. Understanding the medical device is also essential for the physician to pass the CME course, thus instilling bias further. This conflict of interest can affect how a patient is treated and how much they have to pay for their treatment. Hospital corporations that help fund these events also promote physician bias, where physicians are likely to recommend one hospital over another, where one hospital may be much more expensive than the other.

There are entities that work to reduce bias in continuing medical education courses. Groups such as the Accreditation Council for Continuing Medical Education work to make the program as unbiased as possible. Other groups like the Medical Education Agency work to reduce pharmaceutical and hospital influence in continuing medical education courses.

Consequences 
The Medical-Industrial Complex poses unique difficulties for patients and physicians. Diseases like chronic illnesses can tie a patient further into the Medical-Industrial Complex for the rest of their life. Likewise, a terminal illness can force a patient to accept their soon passing, but also deal with the consequences of the illness and how they must pay for it.

Patient-level 
A health professional offers a unique service to patients, since patients are oftentimes completely vulnerable to the guidance and wisdom of their healthcare provider. Likewise, a patient needs unique, reliable help, especially in situations where they are physically, emotionally, and oftentimes financially vulnerable. Many healthcare corporations exploit this vulnerability and can often in-debt patients as a result. For example, if a person is involved in a car accident and becomes unable to communicate, they are taken to the nearest hospital. Thus, they cannot refuse nor accept medical treatment. This is especially important as it involves the complex interaction between making a profit from a patient's suffering, but also physicians having to treat the patient as effectively as possible. For patients who do not have access to reliable health insurance, this imposes expensive medical treatment that they must pay for.

For patients with a chronic illness, diagnosis often means expensive medications for the rest of one's life. Chronic illnesses like depression may require medications until the disease is treated, whereas more severe chronic illnesses like cystic fibrosis require expensive medical and pharmaceutical treatments for one's entire life. These diseases could be treated but their unique long-lasting nature means money can be generated from life-long treatments as opposed to an end-all treatment.

Physician-level 
Physicians are subjective to the Medical-Industrial Complex and its manifestations. Throughout the 21st century plastic surgery has become more common, where people have surgeries performed to solve a cosmetic issue. Cosmetic surgeries are often used to satisfy a certain beauty standard. An example of this is a rhinoplasty, which is oftentimes a purely cosmetic surgery that is not life-saving or necessary for increasing one's quality-of-life. For-profit healthcare introduces the idea of nonessential healthcare that can oftentimes more problems than solved. Likewise, performing excessive amounts of cosmetic surgeries can increase one's social standing, signifying that they have the means to afford expensive, luxurious surgeries that others cannot afford. For-profit healthcare promotes non-essential healthcare services so that more profits can be created from healthy populations.

The phrase "no margin, no mission" is often used to describe for-profit healthcare, where medical centers will adapt to corporate interests so they can stay in business. For physicians, this can mean not treating uninsured patients, performing unnecessary procedures that generate profit, or supplying better care to patients that have better means of pay. This also has great moral and ethical considerations for physicians who feel obligated to better care for well-insured patients as opposed to under-insured, vulnerable patients.

Corporate entities also enact standards over compliance, rules, disclosures and regulations. These rules disregard ethical and moral dilemmas that physicians often face, setting unattainable standards on situations that cannot be determined by a clause. Not only this, insurance companies also enforce rules and regulations surrounding medical treatment and payout. Physicians are often tied between healthcare corporations and insurance companies determining what they can and cannot do for a patient, whether it is necessary or not.

Manufacturers of medical devices fund medical education programs and physicians and hospitals directly to adopt the use of their devices. Many pharmaceutical and medical device companies are investor-based, meaning that if a device or drug receives FDA approval the physicians will be financially invested in its success or demise. Thus, a physician who is financially involved in a product or service is more likely to promote or utilize the product, whether or not its efficacy is known. This provides a complex conflict of interest for physicians and patients, who may not receive effective, safe treatment due to physician bias for one product over another.

According to Paul Starr, author of The Social Transformation of American Medicine, physicians hold a unique position between patients and hospitals. The MI Complex can increase efficiency in hospitals, where patients can enter and receive care at quicker rates.

Laws and policies 

The influence of economic policy on the practice of medicine has a long history.

The Dalkon Shield was an IUD introduced in the late 1970's and 1980's. The long-term effects of using this device were not well known, and the device ended up being very ineffective and dangerous, leading women to becoming pregnant or having severe complications. The manufacturers of this device said that their IUS was safer than other forms of birth control available, and none of their reports noted potential safety issues. When the device was discontinued after CDC and FDA investigations, the IUDs were not recalled and still produced dangerous complications for women who had them. This shows the dangerous background of the MI Complex and prioritizing profit over the safety and wellbeing of patients. Likewise, because this device did not prevent pregnancy, many fetuses with severe birth defects were born. The long-term effects of this device were not properly investigated and contributed to dangerous medical devices in the healthcare market.

The Safe Medical Devices Act of 1990 was passed by the FDA as an amendment to the FDCA and requires the manufacturer to report information about medical devices contributing to death, sickness, or injury. This allows healthcare professionals to report malfunctioning, unsafe medical equipment.

Certain drugs only offer expensive name-brand options and give patients no option to afford a cheaper, generic-brand medication. This monopoly was brought to the United States Supreme Court and was ruled constitutional if corporations pay to maintain their monopolies.

The Physician Payments Sunshine Act from the United States Department of Justice declared that all consulting contracts and gifts medical device companies make with physicians must be made public. This curbs surgeons from promoting and overusing medical devices in patients based on bias.

In other countries 

The MI Complex is also present in India, where the Indian Medical Association lobbies for their interests at the local and state-level in politics.

Because the General Agreement on Trade in Services regulates international marketplaces, in countries where the industrial-medical complex is more strong there can be legal limitations to consumer options for accessing diverse healthcare services.

Brazil 
In Brazil, the medical-industrial complex morphs into a "healthcare-industrial concept." The concept expands beyond Brazil, where medical demands are not met with internal infrastructure and patients cannot receive the products and services they need. Brazil's medical history arguably had poor distribution of social and economic medical policies, leaving the healthcare sector underdeveloped and underfunded in poor communities. The Program for Investment in the Health Industrial Complex, or PROCIS, funds medical research in Brazil to help move Brazil onto a global scale in pharmaceutical and medical industries. According to the Brazilian Ministry of Health, PROCIS was formed with the goal to develop Brazil's internal healthcare structure and promote research, development, and treatment. Over 100 billion Brazilian Reals have been devoted to supporting medical research efforts, development of the medical industry, and innovating existing medical products. The PROCIS also established a margin of preference on healthcare products that were nationally funded and sourced.

See also 
 List of industrial complexes
 Conflict of interest
 Continuing medical education
 Conflict of interest in the healthcare industry
 For-profit hospital
 Poverty and health in the United States
 Healthcare in Brazil

References

Further reading

Health economics
Industrial complexes